Yasir Ali (Urdu: یاسر علی) (born 15 October 1985) is a Pakistani former cricketer who played for the Pakistan national cricket team in 2003 in his only test cricket match. He was a right-handed batsman and a right-arm medium-fast bowler who has played one Test match for his country against Bangladesh at the age of 19.

Ali's potential was first realised when he played for Attock(chach)Hazro. He then was selected for a training camp with the Pakistani Cricket Academy soon after, where he went for a successful tour of South Africa. He subsequently became one of a handful of players in Cricketing history to make their first-class debut and Test debut in the same match.

References

1985 births
Living people
Pakistan Test cricketers
Pakistani cricketers
Rawalpindi cricketers
Rawalpindi Rams cricketers
Zarai Taraqiati Bank Limited cricketers
Federal Areas cricketers
Khan Research Laboratories cricketers
Quetta cricketers
Baluchistan Bears cricketers
Pakistan Telecommunication Company Limited cricketers
Bangladesh East Zone cricketers
Cricketers from Attock
Pakistani emigrants to the United Kingdom
British people of Punjabi descent